Florian Miguel (born 1 September 1996) is a French professional footballer who plays as a left-back for Spanish club SD Huesca.

Personal life
Miguel was born in France to a French mother and Portuguese father. He is a France youth international.

References

External links

Living people
1996 births
Association football midfielders
French footballers
France youth international footballers
French people of Portuguese descent
Ligue 1 players
Ligue 2 players
Championnat National 2 players
Championnat National 3 players
Tours FC players
Nîmes Olympique players
SD Huesca footballers
French expatriate footballers
French expatriate sportspeople in Spain
Expatriate footballers in Spain